Was It Something I Said? is a British comedy panel show that was broadcast on Channel 4, presented by David Mitchell and featuring team captains Richard Ayoade and Micky Flanagan. Celebrity guest narrators appeared in each episode, including David Harewood, Phil Daniels, Charles Dance and Mariella Frostrup.

The show was spun off from the Quotables website, commissioned by Adam Gee at Channel 4 in collaboration with the Arts Council England in 2011. The programme included a play-along second screen game based entirely on Twitter.

Rounds

Threesomes
The panel had to guess which of three celebrities said a particular quote read out by the guest narrator.  The same celebrity could have more than one quote.  At the end of this round, Mitchell asked the home viewers to complete a famous quote via Twitter, and upon return from the commercial break, asked the panel to complete it.

Key Words
The panelists were given only specific key words and must complete the entire quotation. For example, the words "score" and "seven" would lead to Abraham Lincoln's famous opening line from the Gettysburg Address, "Four score and seven years ago, our fathers brought forth on this continent a new nation, conceived in liberty and dedicated to the proposition that all men are created equal."

What Are They Talking About?
A quote was given completely out of context and the panelists had to determine the context of why the quote was said.

Was It Something I Said?
Teams played one at a time and have to determine if the quote was said by either of the opposing team members, David Mitchell, the guest narrator, or a "virtual TV guest" (random celebrity).

Episode guide
The coloured backgrounds denote the result of each of the shows:

 – Indicates Micky's team won.
 – Indicates Richard's team won.
 – Indicates the game ended in a draw.

References

External links
 
 
 

2013 British television series debuts
2013 British television series endings
British panel games
2010s British game shows
Channel 4 comedy
Channel 4 panel games
English-language television shows
Television series by All3Media